TVNZ teletext was the only analog teletext in New Zealand. It was also available on Freeview. It was launched in 1984 with funding raised in the 1981 New Zealand Telethon, to provide news and information for the deaf. The information service closed on 2 April 2013, but television captions will continue. TVNZ cited the reasons for closure due to the aging equipment used and the reduce need for such a service as most information can now be found online.

It carried: 
World and New Zealand news
Extensive weather information, including marine and coastal forecasts
Sports news, results and statistics
Business news
Financial market information
International and domestic flight arrivals and departures
TV schedules
Lottery results
TAB horse racing and sports betting odds and results (still available on Trackside Channel, page 600)
Lifestyle information such as horoscopes

It also had captions to most recorded programs.

Teletext was available to viewers of TVNZ channels such as TV One, TV2 and TVNZ U. The service was also available on privately owned station TV3. A separate Teletext service is available to Trackside viewers on page 600; this service has continued to operate following the closure of the TVNZ service. TAB horse was also available on the TVNZ service.

References

TVNZ
Teletext
1984 establishments in New Zealand
1984 in New Zealand television
2013 disestablishments in New Zealand